Museum Campus/11th Street (formerly Roosevelt Road) is a commuter rail station in downtown Chicago that serves the Metra Electric Line north to Millennium Station and south to University Park, Blue Island and South Chicago; and the South Shore Line to Gary and South Bend, Indiana.

Roosevelt Road station was located where Roosevelt Road intersects the former Illinois Central Railroad line. The station was the former commuter platforms of Central Station, the long-distance IC passenger terminal that was previously located adjacent to this spot. The station structures appeared rickety and run-down, and have since been removed and replaced by a new station located at 11th Street.

Most South Shore line trains stop at the station, and all but one early morning outbound Metra train stop at the station.

Bus and rail connections
CTA Red Line, CTA Orange and Green Lines
Roosevelt

CTA Buses 
  1 Bronzeville/Union Station 
  3 King Drive 
  4 Cottage Grove (Owl Service) 
  X4 Cottage Grove Express 
  6 Jackson Park Express 
  12 Roosevelt 
  18 16th/18th 
  130 Museum Campus (Summer Service Only) 
  146 Inner Lake Shore/Michigan Express

References

External links 
 

 South Shore Line - Stations

Metra stations in Chicago
South Shore Line stations in Illinois